The 8th District of the Iowa Senate is located in southwestern Iowa, and is currently composed of Pottawattamie County.

Current elected officials
Dan Dawson is the senator currently representing the 8th District.

The area of the 8th District contains two Iowa House of Representatives districts:
The 15th District (represented by Charlie McConkey)
The 16th District (represented by Brent Siegrist)

The district is also located in Iowa's 3rd congressional district, which is represented by U.S. Representative Cindy Axne.

Past senators
The district has previously been represented by:

James C. Ramsey, 1856–1857
John A. Johnson, 1858–1859
William F. Coolbaugh, 1860–1861
John G. Foote, 1862–1863
Lewis W. Ross, 1864–1867
Napoleon B. Moore, 1868–1871
J.S. McIntyre, 1872–1875
Alfred Hebard, 1876–1883
James S. Hendrie, 1884–1887
Thomas Weidman, 1888–1891
A.J. Chantry, 1892–1895
Joseph M. Junkin, 1896–1903
Shirley Gillilland, 1904–1912
Frank F. Jones, 1913–1916
W.F. Ratcliff, 1917–1920
H.A. Darting, 1921–1928
William Cochrane, 1929–1932
Homer Hush, 1933–1936
Kenneth A. Evans, 1937–1944
Oscar Hultman, 1945–1952
Henry W. Washburn, 1953–1956
William H. Harbor, 1957–1960
Edward A. Wearin, 1961–1963
Clifford M. Vance, 1964–1966
Richard L. Stephens, 1967–1970
S.J. Brownlee, 1971–1972
Hilarius L. Heying, 1973–1976
Rolf Craft, 1977–1982
Berl Priebe, 1983–1996
James Black, 1997
E. Thurman Gaskill, 1998–2002
Mark Zieman, 2003–2008
Mary Jo Wilhelm, 2009–2012
Michael Gronstal, 2013–2016
Dan Dawson, 2017–present

See also
Iowa General Assembly
Iowa Senate

References

08